Georgette Nkoma (born 16 June 1965) is a Cameroonian sprinter. At the 1996 African Championships she won gold medals in both 100 and 200 metres. She also competed at the World Championships in 1993, 1995 and 1997, as well as in 4 × 100 m relay at the 1996 Summer Olympics without reaching the final.

References

External links
 

1965 births
Living people
Cameroonian female sprinters
Athletes (track and field) at the 1992 Summer Olympics
Athletes (track and field) at the 1996 Summer Olympics
Olympic athletes of Cameroon
World Athletics Championships athletes for Cameroon
Olympic female sprinters
20th-century Cameroonian women
21st-century Cameroonian women